Management Education & Research Institute (MERI) is a private college established in 1994, affiliated with Guru Gobind Singh Indraprastha University and located in Janakpuri, Delhi. MERI is recognised as non-government unaided institute under section 2(f) by UGC. Admission to MERI (except for PGDM programme) is through the Common Entrance Test (CET) conducted by Guru Gobind Singh Indraprastha University.

Recognition and accreditation
MERI has been accredited by the National Assessment and Accreditation Council (NAAC) with a "B++" grade. The institute offers MBA, BBA,B.COM,BCA,BA(JMC)PGDM full-time courses.

References

Universities and colleges in Delhi
Colleges of the Guru Gobind Singh Indraprastha University
Business schools in Delhi